The NHIAA (New Hampshire Interscholastic Athletic Association) is the governing body for competitions among all public and some private high schools in the state of New Hampshire. For most sponsored sports, the state is divided into 4 categories by school size: Large, Intermediate, Medium, and Small (L, I, M, S). Football is separated in a different way as seen below.

2012 division memberships

Division I 

 Concord
 Exeter
 Londonderry
 Manchester Central
 Manchester Memorial
 Nashua North
 Nashua South
 Pinkerton
 Salem

Division II 

 Bedford
 Bishop Guertin       
 Dover
 Keene
 Manchester West
 Merrimack
 Spaulding
 Timberlane
 Winnacunnet

Division III 

 Alvirne
 ConVal
 Goffstown
 Hollis/Brookline
 Merrimack Valley
 Milford
 Pembroke
 Portsmouth
 Souhegan

Division IV 

 Hanover
 John Stark
 Kennett
 Kingswood
 Laconia
 Lebanon
 Plymouth
 St. Thomas
 Trinity
 Windham

Division V 

 Bow
 Epping-Newmarket
 Inter-Lakes
 Kearsarge
 Monadnock
 Pelham
 Sanborn Regional
 Somersworth
 Stevens

Division VI 

 Bishop Brady
 Campbell
 Farmington
 Franklin
 Gilford
 Mascoma
 Newfound
 Newport
 Raymond
 Winnisquam

2008 division memberships 

Beginning with the 2008 football season, teams were reorganized into 6 divisions based on size and location: I-VI.

Division I 

 Concord
 Londonderry
 Manchester Central
 Manchester Memorial
 Manchester West
 Nashua North
 Nashua South
 Pinkerton
 Salem

Division II 

 Alvirne
 Bishop Guertin       
 Dover
 Exeter
 Keene
 Merrimack
 Spaulding
 Timberlane
 Winnacunnet

Division III 

 Bedford
 ConVal
 Goffstown
 Hollis/Brookline
 John Stark
 Milford
 Pembroke
 Portsmouth
 Souhegan

Division IV 

 Hanover
 Kennett
 Kingswood
 Laconia
 Lebanon
 Merrimack Valley
 Monadnock
 Plymouth
 Sanborn

Division V 

 Bishop Brady
 Bow
 Epping-Newmarket
 Kearsarge
 Pelham
 Somersworth
 St. Thomas
 Stevens
 Trinity

Division VI 

 Campbell
 Fall Mountain
 Farmington
 Franklin
 Gilford
 Inter-Lakes
 Mascoma
 Newfound
 Newport
 Winnisquam

2006-2007 division memberships 

For the 2006 and 2007 football seasons, teams were divided into 5 divisions based on size and location: I-V.

Division I 

 Concord
 Londonderry
 Manchester Central
 Manchester Memorial
 Manchester West
 Nashua North
 Nashua South
 Pinkerton
 Salem
 Trinity*

 Trinity played an independent schedule for the year 2007.

Division II 

 Alvirne
 Bishop Guertin
 Dover
 Exeter
 Goffstown
 Keene
 Merrimack
 Spaulding
 Timberlane
 Winnacunnet

Division III 

 ConVal
 John Stark
 Kennett
 Kingswood
 Merrimack Valley
 Milford
 Pembroke
 Plymouth
 Portsmouth
 Souhegan

Division IV 

 Fall Mountain
 Hanover
 Hollis/Brookline
 Kearsarge
 Laconia
 Lebanon
 Monadnock
 Somersworth
 St. Thomas
 Stevens

Division V 

 Bishop Brady
 Bow
 Campbell
 Epping
 Farmington
 Franklin
 Gilford
 Newfound
 Newport
 Pelham
 Winnisquam

References

American football in New Hampshire
High school sports in New Hampshire